Koopmans  is a Dutch occupational surname meaning "merchant's". Notable people with the surname include:

 Aart Koopmans (1946–2007), Dutch businessman
 Ger Koopmans (born 1962), Dutch CDA politician
 Leo Koopmans (born 1953), Dutch ice hockey player
 Luuk Koopmans (born 1993), Dutch football goalkeeper
Marion Koopmans (born 1956), Dutch virologist
 Rachel Koopmans, Canadian historian
 Rudy Koopmans (born 1948), Dutch boxer
Ruud Koopmans (born 1961), Dutch sociologist
 Thijmen Koopmans (1929–2015), Dutch judge
 Tini Koopmans (1912–1981), Dutch high jumper, discus thrower and shot putter
 Tjalling Koopmans (1910–1985), Dutch American mathematician, physicist and economist and Nobel Laureate
 Koopmans' theorem, a quantum chemistry theorem published by Tjalling Koopmans

See also
Koopman

References

Dutch-language surnames
Occupational surnames